M. exigua may refer to:

 Madia exigua, a western North American plant
 Meloidogyne exigua, a coffee root-knot nematode
 Micromystix exigua, a snout moth
 Micropyxis exigua, a perennial herb
 Miresa exigua, a slug moth
 Mitromorpha exigua, a sea snail
 Mordellistena exigua, a tumbling flower beetle
 Mycosphaerella exigua, a plant pathogen
 Myrmecia exigua, a bulldog ant
 Myrmica exigua, an ant with a binodal petiole
 Myrmicaria exigua, an ant with an antenna with seven segments